Guanyinge Reservoir is a large-scale reservoir located on the main stream of Taizi River, Benxi County, Liaoning Province. Its water surface is 62 square kilometers, with a total storage capacity of 2.2 billion cubic meters.

Guanyinge Reservoir is a Sino-Japanese cooperation project,  which is a key project of Liaoning Province and the Ministry of Water Resources of the People's Republic of China using Japanese yen loans,  with a total investment of 1.568 billion yuan, of which 11.78 billion yen is used for loans in Japanese yen.

The main project of Guanyinge Reservoir was officially started in May 1990 and was completed in September 1995.

References 

Reservoirs in China
1995 establishments in China
Buildings and structures in Liaoning
Benxi Manchu Autonomous County